John J. DeSimone (born November 26, 1960 in Providence, Rhode Island) is an American politician, a former Democratic member of the Rhode Island House of Representatives who represented House District 6 from January 1993 until January 2003 and District 5 from January 2003 to January 2017.  DeSimone was narrowly defeated in the 2016 Democratic primary by progressive candidate Marcia Ranglin-Vassell, ending his 24 year tenure in the General Assembly.

Education
DeSimone earned his BA from Providence College and his JD from Suffolk University Law School.

Elections
1992 DeSimone won the September 15, 1992 Democratic Primary against incumbent Representative Thomas J. Rossi, and was unopposed for the November 3, 1992 General election, winning with 2,872 votes.
1994 DeSimone was unopposed for the September 13, 1994 Democratic Primary and won the November 8, 1994 General election with 2,600 votes (72.6%) against Republican nominee John Walsh.
1996 DeSimone and returning 1994 Republican challenged John Walsh were both unopposed for their September 10, 1996 primaries, setting up a rematch; DeSimone won the three-way November 5, 1996 General election with 2,527 votes (68.8%) against Independent candidate Joseph Casoli and Walsh.
1998 DeSimone was unopposed for both the September 15, 1998 Democratic Primary, winning with 609 votes and the November 3, 1998 General election, winning with 2,299 votes.
2000 DeSimone was unopposed for both the September 12, 2000 Democratic Primary, winning with 786 votes and the November 7, 2000 General election, winning with 2,435 votes.
2002 Redistricted to District 5, and with incumbent Representative Gordon D. Fox redistricted to District 4, DeSimone was unopposed for the September 10, 2002 Democratic Primary, winning with 1,548 votes and won the November 5, 2002 General election with 2,692 votes (82.4%) against Republican nominee Karl Poirier.
2004 DeSimone was unopposed for the September 14, 2004 Democratic Primary, winning with 278 votes and won the November 2, 2004 General election with 3,129 votes (78.0%) against Republican nominee Ramiro Fernandez.
2006 DeSimone was challenged in the September 12, 2006 Democratic Primary, winning with 1,209 votes (79.7%); returning 2004 Republican challenger Ramiro Fernandez was unopposed for his primary, setting up a rematch; DeSimone won the November 7, 2006 General election with 2,934 votes (83.3%) against Fernandez.
2008 DeSimone was challenged in the September 9, 2008 Democratic Primary, winning with 410 votes (70.2%) and was unopposed for the November 4, 2008 General election, winning with 3,752 votes.
2010 DeSimone was challenged in the September 23, 2010 Democratic Primary, winning with 1,339 votes (72.7%) and won the November 2, 2010 General election with 2,298 votes (75.7%) against Republican nominee Mark Garofalo.
2012 DeSimone was unopposed for the September 11, 2012 Democratic Primary, winning with 625 votes and won the November 6, 2012 General election with 2,615 votes (74.3%) against Republican nominee Daniel Grzych.
2014  On March 25, 2014 DeSimone was elected Majority Leader of the Rhode Island House of Representatives; succeeding Majority Leader Nicolas A. Mattiello, who became Speaker of the House.  Rep. Mattiello was elected Speaker, when Speaker Gordon D. Fox was forced to resign upon becoming the subject of a Federal Wire Fraud, Bribery and Failure to File a Tax Return investigation, and law enforcement raids on his home and the Speaker's office. (Fox pled Guilty to the charges in March 2015)]
2016 In August, Rhode Island Progressive Democrats filed a complaint against Rep. DeSimone with the Rhode Island Ethics Commission; based on him not listing delinquent state and local property tax debts and tax liens on his financial disclosure forms. R.I. Progressives endorsed DeSimone’s primary opponent, Marcia Ranglin-Vassell in the September Primary. Rep. DeSimone had earlier said that his allowing property tax obligations to become delinquent and then paying them before a "tax sale" on the property, was a method of financial management which he used. He lost the Primary on September 13, 2016 with 661 votes to Ranglin-Vassell's 682. He then ran a write-in campaign for the General election on November 8, 2016 but lost to Ranglin-Vassell.

References

External links
Official page at the Rhode Island General Assembly

John DeSimone at Ballotpedia
John DeSimone at OpenSecrets

1960 births
Living people
Democratic Party members of the Rhode Island House of Representatives
Politicians from Providence, Rhode Island
Providence College alumni
Rhode Island lawyers
Suffolk University Law School alumni
21st-century American politicians